Lava is a 1980 Indian Malayalam-language film, directed by Hariharan and produced by G. P. Balan. The film stars Prem Nazir, Jagathy Sreekumar, Prameela and Sathar. The film has musical score by G. Devarajan. It is a remake of the Hindi film Gunga Jumna (1961).

Cast 

Prem Nazir as Ramu
Jagathy Sreekumar as Kuttappan
Prameela as Janaki
Sathaar as Gopi
Bahadoor as Govindan
Balan K. Nair as Velayudhan
G. K. Pillai as Police Officer
Jayamalini as Dancer
K. P. Ummer as Rajasekharan
Krishna Kurup
Kunjandi as Kumaran
Madhavi as Seetha
Nellikode Bhaskaran as Gopalan
Oduvil Unnikrishnan as Panikkar
Sumithra as Sindhu
P. R. Varalakshmi as Rajasekharan's wife
Santo Krishnan

Soundtrack 
The music was composed by G. Devarajan and the lyrics were written by Yusufali Kechery.

References

External links 
 

1980 films
1980s Malayalam-language films
Indian Western (genre) films
Malayalam remakes of Hindi films
Films directed by Hariharan
1980 Western (genre) films